Sar Takht or Sartakht or Sar-e Takht may refer to:
 Sar Takht, Isfahan
 Sar Takht, Shahr-e Babak, Kerman Province
 Sartakht, Zarand, Kerman Province
 Sar Takht, Kermanshah
 Sar Takht-e Do Rahan, Khuzestan Province
 Sar Takht, Lorestan
 Sar Takht, Semnan

See also
 Sar Takhtgah